Abd ol Azizabad (also Romanized as ʿAbd ol ʿAzīzābād; also known as ‘Abd ol ‘Azīz) is a village in Gowhar Kuh Rural District, Nukabad District, Khash County, Sistan and Baluchestan Province, Iran. At the 2006 census, its population was 144, in 32 families.

References 

Populated places in Khash County